Elshan Huseynov (born 21 November 1977) — Azerbaijani paralympic powerlifter. He won bronze at the 2010 World Championships in Kuala Lumpur. He also won gold medal at the 2013 Open European Championships in Alexin. At this competition Huseynov lifted 225 kg, which was a new World and European Record.

Elshan Huseynov represented Azerbaijan at the 2008 Summer Paralympics in Beijing, where he took 5th place, and at the 2012 Summer Paralympics in London, where he took 4th place with a result of 230 kg.

He was included in the National Paralympic Committee of Azerbaijan's top 10 athletes of 2010.

References 

Paralympic powerlifters of Azerbaijan
Powerlifters at the 2008 Summer Paralympics
Powerlifters at the 2012 Summer Paralympics
1977 births
Living people
People from Sumgait
Powerlifters at the 2020 Summer Paralympics
21st-century Azerbaijani people